Tomoe Zenimoto Hvas (born 1 June 2000) is a retired Norwegian swimmer. He competed in the men's 50 metre butterfly at the 2019 World Aquatics Championships. He comes from Bærum, and has a Norwegian father and Japanese mother; also residing in Japan from 2007 to 2010.
In 2022 he definitely retired from swimming competitions at only 22 years old, holding 18 Norwegian national records.

References

External links
 
 
 
 
 

 

2000 births
Living people
Sportspeople from Bærum
Norwegian people of Japanese descent
Norwegian male medley swimmers
Place of birth missing (living people)
Swimmers at the 2018 Summer Youth Olympics
Youth Olympic gold medalists for Norway
Norwegian male butterfly swimmers
Norwegian male backstroke swimmers
Swimmers at the 2020 Summer Olympics
Olympic swimmers of Norway
21st-century Norwegian people